The 2016–17 North Dakota Fighting Hawks women's basketball team represents the University of North Dakota during the 2016–17 NCAA Division I women's basketball season. The Fighting Hawks, led by fifth year head coach Travis Brewster and play their home games at the Betty Engelstad Sioux Center. They were members of the Big Sky Conference. They finished the season 20–11, 15–3 in Big Sky play to share the Big Sky regular season championship with Montana State. They lost in the quarterfinals of the Big Sky women's tournament where they lost to Portland State. They received an automatic bid to the Women's National Invitation Tournament where they lost to South Dakota in the first round.

Roster

Schedule

|-
!colspan=9 style="background:#009E60; color:#000000;"| Exhibition

|-
!colspan=9 style="background:#009E60; color:#000000;"| Non-conference regular season

|-
!colspan=9 style="background:#009E60; color:#000000;"| Big Sky regular season

|-
!colspan=9 style="background:#009E60; color:#000000;"| Big Sky tournament

|-
!colspan=9 style="background:#009E60; color:#000000;"| WNIT

See also
2016–17 North Dakota Fighting Hawks men's basketball team

References

North Dakota Fighting Hawks women's basketball seasons
North Dakota
2017 Women's National Invitation Tournament participants